Julius Caesar Falar Herrera (born April 21, 1953) is a Filipino lawyer and politician. Herrera served as Vice Governor of Bohol and as president of the Vice Governors League of the Philippines.

He was married to Atty. Florenda Leyson Herrera.

Education
Herrera finished Bachelor of Laws at the University of San Jose Recoletos in Cebu City in 1980 and in 1981 successfully passed the Bar examination. 

Elementary education, Zapatera Elementary School, 1964
Secondary education, University of San Carlos, 1972
College, Bachelor of Laws, University of San Jose–Recoletos, 1980

Sources
 https://web.archive.org/web/20080729003802/http://www.lvgp.gov.ph/resolutions/2005-004.html
 http://vgo-sp.bohol.gov.ph/index.php?module=announce&ANN_id=122&ANN_user_op=view

20th-century Filipino lawyers
1953 births
Living people
Lakas–CMD (1991) politicians
Members of the Bohol Provincial Board
Mayors of places in Bohol
University of San Carlos alumni
University of San Jose–Recoletos alumni